The Decoy (2006) is a Western film that was shot in 2005 and finished in 2007 by Higgins/Kreinbrink Productions, an Arizona motion picture company.

Synopsis 
The story focuses on a mute blacksmith who is blamed for the murder of his surrogate parents. He must find a way to prove his innocence before his brother in law, a deputy named John, can bring him to Tucson, where he will be quickly tried and hung.

Production 
The Decoy was initially planned as a short film based on a 35 page script. At the end of principal photography, they ended up with a 70-minute movie, mostly due to the amount of time needed to show the reactions of the main character, who is mute. Filming took place over seventeen weeks and overall production took eighteen months. Kreinbrink was approached by several individuals interested in helping with the filming and production process of a Western.

Release 
The Decoy premiered in 2006 at  The Fox Theatre in Tucson, AZ and was released on home video in 2007 through Echo Bridge Home Entertainment.

Reception 
True West Magazine was critical in their review, noting that "I’d hope that Kreinbrink’s next shot at a Western is more ambitious and less sentimental, and a tad less pretty; I get the feeling he’d be good at something darker and considerably more detailed." Michael Pitts was more favorable, stating that it was a "Low budget but enjoyable affair".

References

Sources
 link AZ Star
 link Tucson Citizen

External links
 

2006 films
2006 Western (genre) films
American Western (genre) films
2000s English-language films
2000s American films